"Beautiful World" is a song by American new wave band Devo, written by Gerald Casale and Mark Mothersbaugh. It appears on their fourth studio album New Traditionalists.

Most of the songs on New Traditionalists are darker and more direct than on previous Devo albums. The exception to this is "Beautiful World," whose message seems optimistic at first but changes as the song progresses. This is made even clearer by the song's promotional video.

Record World called it a "positive pop piece" that is "a polished, multi-format rocker."

In addition to the standard 7-inch single, "Beautiful World" was also released as a picture disc. This version features the same image of a paper mask of a cosmonaut's face as the standard single sleeve and is cut in the shape of the cosmonaut's head. The picture disc version also includes a different B-side: the spoken word "Nu-tra Speaks (New Traditionalist Man)."

Promotional music video
The music video was inspired by the works of experimental film collagist Bruce Connor. The video features the character Booji Boy prominently, as he initially watches scenes of beautiful women, futuristic cars and other happy elements, which by the end of the song have been replaced by images of race riots, the Ku Klux Klan, World War I, famine in Africa, car crashes and nuclear explosions, which puts a much darker slant on the song's lyrics.

Track listing

Chart performance

Cover versions
Indie rock band Harvey Danger
Synth-pop band Information Society, with vocals by Gerald Casale of Devo.
Rap rock group Rage Against the Machine on their final studio album Renegades

References

External links
Official music video
Audio only video

1981 songs
1981 singles
Devo songs
Rage Against the Machine songs
Songs written by Gerald Casale
Songs written by Mark Mothersbaugh
Warner Records singles